The Yellow Coach Manufacturing Company (informally Yellow Coach) was an early manufacturer of passenger buses in the United States. Between 1923 and 1943, Yellow Coach built transit buses, electric-powered trolley buses, and parlor coaches.

Founded in Chicago in 1923 by John D. Hertz as a subsidiary of his Yellow Cab Company, the company was renamed "Yellow Truck and Coach Manufacturing Company" in 1925 when General Motors (GM) purchased a majority stake. After GM completely acquired the company in 1943, it was merged with GM's truck division to form the GM Truck & Coach Division.

The car rental subsidiary (known both as Hertz Drivurself Corp and Yellow Drive-It-Yourself) was purchased back by John Hertz in 1953 through The Omnibus Corporation and floated the following year as The Hertz Corporation.

History 
John D. Hertz and associates began acquiring smaller Chicago-area companies involved in bus-building in 1922, and soon assembled a manufacturing site covering four square blocks. Yellow Coach Manufacturing Co was formally established in 1923 as a subsidiary of Hertz's Yellow Cab Company, and sold 207 buses in its first year.

George J. Rackham, whose career had commenced with the London General Omnibus Company after the First World War, spent the years 1922–1926 in the U.S., and recognised the advantage of low swept chassis frame for bus development while employed by Yellow. It is likely that he was recruited by Hertz to help start up the bus building business. In 1926, he returned to England to join Leyland Motors as Chief Engineer and was responsible for the groundbreaking Titan and Tiger models.

General Motors purchased a controlling stake in the company in 1925 and changed the name to the Yellow Truck & Coach Manufacturing Company, and relocated production to Pontiac West Assembly in Pontiac, Michigan.  Within the transit industry, the company continued to be called simply Yellow Coach.

In the 1930s, Yellow Coach produced best-selling models for the rapidly expanding urban transit and intercity bus businesses. (In 1935, national intercity bus ridership climbed 50% to 651,999,000 passengers, surpassing the volume of passengers carried by the Class I railroads for the first time. ) Yellow Coach played a significant role in the transition from electric streetcars (operating on rails, powered by overhead wires) to transit companys' use of gasoline- or diesel-powered buses operating on rubber wheels (changing from solid wheels to pneumatic tires). For Greyhound Lines, the largest operator of intercity bus service, Yellow Coach developed distinctive streamlined models which introduced a high floor, underfloor luggage storage, a flat front, air conditioning, and a diesel engine, supplying more than 1,250 buses during Greyhounds' years of fastest growth.

GM purchased the company outright in 1943, merging it into their GM Truck Division to form GM Truck & Coach Division. Although GM continued with the Yellow Coach T-series and P-series product lines, the Yellow Coach badge gave way to the GM Coach or just GM nameplate in 1944. Widespread production of Yellow Coach designs—including certain ZIS buses produced in the Soviet Union—continued until 1959. Limited production of the two remaining small-capacity "Old Look" models (3101/3102 and 3501/3502) would continue until 1969. GMC badges did not appear until 1968.

Car rental - Hertz Drivurself Corp/Yellow Drive-It-Yourself 
The company owned a subsidiary, known as either Hertz 'Drivurself Corp' or 'Yellow Drive-It-Yourself' which was sold with Yellow Coach to General Motors and eventual purchased back by Hertz in 1953 with The Omnibus Corporation which was then renamed The Hertz Corporation the following year.

Models produced

Letter series (1923–1936) 
Yellow started its model designation at the end of the alphabet and worked forward. Initially four types were offered:
 Z type single-deck bus or coach
 Z type double-deck bus
 Y type coach
 X type bus or coach.
All were conventional front-engine design vehicles powered by Yellow Knight I4 sleeve-valve gasoline engines, or a General Electric gas-electric hybrid unless noted otherwise. The Knight engine was connected to the rear wheels by a mechanical drive shaft.  In gas-electric models, a gasoline engine in front supplied electric power to two large electric motors mounted on the rear axle.

700-series (1931–1939) 

In 1931, Yellow Coach introduced its 700 series buses, featuring one of the first bus designs to mount the engine in the rear. Mounting the engine in the rear represented a significant innovation, reducing mechanical losses, noise, and weight of a long drive shaft and exhaust running between a front engine and the rear drive and tailpipe.  Bus manufacturers in Germany and the United Kingdom would not perfect rear-engine models until the 1950s.  Customers did not always prefer rear-engined designs, noting that front engines were easier to access, and placed engine noise and vibration away from passengers and sometimes outside the coach body. Eventually, the 700 series included both front- and rear-engined models.

In 1934, Dwight Austin, patent-holder on an innovative rear-drive system, was hired by Yellow Coach and soon developed new models in the 700-series with transverse engines and a “V” angle drive. The V-drive and other innovations introduced in the 700 series would become long-lasting standards: air conditioning, diesel engines, a flat front, a high passenger floor (with luggage beneath), and unibody construction. The V-drive would be GM's standard configuration until the 1980s.

Best-selling transit buses: Models 718 and 728 
Notable 700-series versions include models 718 and 728 which were developed for use as urban transit. Model 718 sold 426 units to large transit operators in New York and Los Angeles, becoming the most popular transit bus of the early 1930s.  Later model 728 sold 1,189 units to transit operators across 9 variants produced in the late 1930s. Both were exclusively rear-engined.

Greyhound (intercity) buses: Models 719 and 743 
For Greyhound Lines, an operator of intercity bus service, Yellow Coach developed model 719 in 1936 which introduced the high floor, underfloor luggage storage, a flat front and streamlined styling. In 1937, model 719 was revised to become model 743 and introduced air conditioning and a diesel engine. Models 719 and 743 were both branded as the Super Coach by Greyhound, and sales were effectively limited to Greyhound and its affiliates.  Greyhound Lines purchased all 1,256 units of model 743 produced between 1937 and 1939.

700 Series production details 

1200-series (1938–1940) 
The Model 1200 series was launched in 1938 with the re-designation of Model 739 as Model 1203 for Public Service Corporation. The 6-model series name ended when three were given new P-series names, and another was given a T-series name.

By 1940, Model 1200 series designs were renamed into either the T- or P-series.  The new model designations indicated type, fuel, propulsion (for transit) or customer (for parlor), seating capacity, and version number. (The first was -01, the second, -02, and so on.)

T-series (1940–1942) 
All "T"-series models were urban transit buses. The model designation consisted of two or three letters followed by four numbers. These gave a basic description of the type of bus:

All models were rear-engined except the 21xx and 24xx series.

P-series (1939–1944) 
The "P" indicated that, as parlor coaches, the P-series was primarily designed for the seated comfort of intercity bus passengers.

GM and GMC

In 1944, General Motors completed its acquisition and merger of Yellow Coach. The T-Series and P-Series production and series numbering continued under the GM and GMC bus brands, along with other variants such as B-Series school buses and S-Series suburban buses. Yellow Coach designs would continue to be widely produced until 1959, when GM introduced its New Look models. The last Yellow Coach design ceased production in 1969.

See also
GM Truck & Coach Division
GM "old-look" transit bus
General Motors streetcar conspiracy

References

Bibliography
Luke, William A. (2001). Yellow Coach Buses - 1923–1943 Photo Archive, Hudson, WI: Iconografix. 
Luke, William A. & Metler, Linda L. (2004). Highway Buses of the 20th Century, Hudson, WI: Iconografix. 
Luke, William A. & Metler, Linda L. (2005). City Transit Buses of the 20th Century, Hudson, WI: Iconografix. 
McKane, John H. & Squier, Gerald L. (2006). Welcome Aboard the GM New Look Bus, Hudson, WI: Iconografix. 
Plachno, Larry (2002). Greyhound Buses Through the Years - Part I, Polo, Il: National Bus Trader Magazine, November, 2002
Stauss, Ed (1988). The Bus World Encyclopedia of Buses, Woodland Hills, CA: Stauss Publications.

External links

Yellow Coach - 1923–1943- GMC Truck & Coach Division, General Motors Corp. - 1943-present - Detroit, Michigan
List of production figures for Yellow/GM "old-look" buses
Ohio Museum of Transportation, omot.org, retrieved on 2006-12-22
Coachbuilt.com - Yellow Coach, coachbuilt.com, retrieved on 2006-12-23
New York Public Library - General Motors Truck Company. Pontiac, Michigan, nypl.org, retrieved on 2018-03-28
New York Public Library - GM Coach Company 1936. Photographs - Specifications, nypl.org, retrieved on 2018-03-28
Coach Information Network, coachinfo.com, retrieved on 2006-12-23

Vehicle manufacturing companies established in 1923
Vehicle manufacturing companies disestablished in 1943
Defunct bus manufacturers of the United States
General Motors marques
1923 establishments in Illinois
1943 disestablishments in Michigan
Trolleybus manufacturers